Dorchester is a civil parish in Westmorland County, New Brunswick, Canada.

For governance purposes it is divided between the city of Dieppe; the villages of Dorchester and Memramcook; the Indian reserve of Fort Folly 1; and the local service district of the parish of Dorchester, which further includes the special services area of Calhoun Road.

All governance units except the Indian reserve are members of the Southeast Regional Service Commission.

Origin of name
The parish was named in honour of the Baron of Dorchester, Governor General of British North America at the time and elder brother of Thomas Carleton, Governor of New Brunswick.

History
Dorchester was erected in 1787 from unassigned territory between Moncton and Sackville Parishes. The parish included parts of modern Moncton, Sackville, and Shediac Parishes.

In 1827 part of Dorchester was included in the newly erected Shediac Parish.

In 1835 all of Dorchester north of a line due east from the mouth of Fox Creek was transferred to Moncton Parish.

In 1894 northern line was changed to a magnetic bearing running 6° 15' south of due east. The 1894 boundaries were made retroactive to the erection of the parish.

Boundaries
Dorchester Parish is bounded:

 on the north by a line running south 83º 45' east from the southern side of the mouth of Fox Creek to a point about 5.75 kilometres past the Memramcook River;
 on the east and southeast by a line running south 11º west about 24 kilometres to a point about 100 metres south of Route 106, on the prolongation of the southeast line of a grant to John Sherwood on Shepody Bay, then running along the prolongation and grant line to strike Shepody Bay at the junction of Ralph Stiles Road and Route 935;
 on the west by Shepody Bay and the Petitcodiac River.

Communities
Communities at least partly within the parish. bold indicates an incorporated municipality or Indian reserve

  Calhoun
 Cherry Burton
 Dieppe
 Upper Dover
 Dorchester
 Dorchester Cape
 Fort Folly 1
 Middleton
  Taylor Village
  Upper Dorchester
 village of Memramcook
 Beaumont
 Belliveau Village
 Boudreau Village
 Breau Creek
 College Bridge
 Cormier Cove
 Dover
 Gautreau Village
 Gaytons
 La Hêtrière
 La Montagne
 Le Lac
 Little Dover
 McGinleys Corner
 Memramcook
 Memramcook East
 Memramcook West
 Pré-d'en-Haut
 Saint-Joseph

Bodies of water
Bodies of water at least partly within the parish.

 Memramcook River
 Petitcodiac River
 Belliveau Creek
 Boudreau Creek
 Boyd Creek
 Breau Creek
 Cormier Cove Creek
 Downing Creek
 Grindstone Creek
 LeBlanc Creek
 McFarlane Creek
 Palmers Creek
 Rockwell Creek
 Steeves Creek
 Stony Creek
 Turner Creek
 Upper Creek
 Shepody Bay
 Folly Lake
 Memramcook Lake

Other notable places
Parks, historic sites, and other noteworthy places at least partly within the parish.
 Dorchester Penitentiary
 Johnson's Mills Protected Natural Area
 Shepody Healing Centre
 Westmorland Institution

Demographics
Parish population total does not include the village of Dorchester, Memramcook, Fort Folly 1, and the portion within Dieppe

Population

Language
Mother tongue (2016)

Access routes
Highways and numbered routes that run through the parish, including external routes that start or finish at the parish limits:

Highways

Principal Routes

Secondary Routes:

External Routes:
None

See also
List of parishes in New Brunswick

Notes

References

Parishes of Westmorland County, New Brunswick
Local service districts of Westmorland County, New Brunswick